Sikkim Manipal University (SMU), formerly Sikkim Manipal University of Health, Medical and Technological Sciences, is a private university located in Gangtok, Sikkim, India. The Sikkim Manipal University started its journey in 1992, after the signing of an agreement between the Government of Sikkim and the Manipal Education & Medical Group (MEMG). The university was officially established in 1995 as Sikkim Manipal University of Health, Medical and Technological Sciences through The Sikkim Manipal University of Health, Medical and Technological Science Act, 1995. The name as changed to Sikkim Manipal University in 2010 through The Sikkim Manipal University of Health, Medical, and Technological Sciences (Amendment) Act, 2009.

Notable alumni 
 Satyarup Siddhanta, B.Tech. (2008)
 Muskan Raj, 2010 IPS, mountaineer

See also 
 List of universities in India

References

External links
 

Education in Sikkim
 
Business schools in Sikkim
Private universities in India
Universities in Sikkim
1995 establishments in Sikkim
Universities and colleges in Sikkim
Educational institutions established in 1995